Bernardo Silva Francisco (born 28 August 1995) is a Portuguese footballer who plays for C.D. Fátima as a goalkeeper.

Football career
On 20 August 2014, Francisco made his professional debut with Atlético CP in a 2014–15 Taça da Liga match against Beira-Mar.

References

External links

Stats and profile at LPFP 

Bernardo Francisco at ZeroZero

1995 births
People from Sintra
Living people
Portuguese footballers
Association football goalkeepers
Atlético Clube de Portugal players
C.D. Fátima players
Liga Portugal 2 players
Sportspeople from Lisbon District